Contraction may refer to:

Linguistics 
 Contraction (grammar), a shortened word
 Poetic contraction, omission of letters for poetic reasons
 Elision, omission of sounds
 Syncope (phonology), omission of sounds in a word
 Synalepha, merged syllables
 Synaeresis, combined vowels
 Crasis, merged vowels or diphthongs

Mathematics and logic 
 Contraction (operator theory), in operator theory, state of a bounded operator between normed vector spaces after suitable scaling
 Contraction hierarchies, in applied mathematics, a technique to speed up shortest-path routing
 Contraction mapping, a type of function on a metric space
 Edge contraction or vertex contraction, graph operations used in graph theory
 Tensor contraction, an operation on one or more tensors that arises from the natural pairing of a finite-dimensional vector space and its dual
 Left contraction and right contraction of multivectors in a geometric algebra, extensions of the inner product
 One of the rules of conditional independence, in probability
 Contraction (logic), a structural rule in proof theory

Medicine 
Muscle contraction, the physiological condition of a muscle which generates tension (traction) at its origin and insertion
 Uterine contraction, contraction of the uterus, such as during childbirth
Contractility, the intrinsic ability of the heart/myocardium to contract
 Wound contraction, a stage in wound healing

Other uses 
 Contraction (economics), a general slowdown in economic activity; the opposite of economic expansion
 Contraction (physics), change in the volume of matter in response to a change in temperature
 Lanthanide contraction, the decrease in size of the ionic radius of lanthanide elements with their growing atomic number
 Contracted (film), a 2013 horror thriller film by Eric England and its sequel Contracted: Phase II (2015) which directed by Josh Forbes

See also 
 Contract (disambiguation)
 Contraction principle (disambiguation)